Indarjit Singh, Baron Singh of Wimbledon  (born 17 September 1932), sometimes transliterated Inderjit Singh, is a British journalist and broadcaster, a prominent British Indian active in Sikh and interfaith activities, and a member of the House of Lords.

He is editor of the Sikh Messenger and known as a presenter of the Thought for the Day segment on BBC Radio 4's Today programme, and BBC Radio 2's Pause for Thought.  He also contributes to British and overseas newspapers and journals including The Times, The Guardian and The Independent.

Biography
Singh was born in 1932 at Rawalpindi, then in the British Indian province of the Punjab, and came to England with his parents in 1933. His father was a medical doctor. He studied engineering at Birmingham University. Between 1955 and 1975, he worked in mining and civil engineering for the National Coal Board, for construction company Costain as a mine manager in India, and in local government in London.

He has advised, or been a member of, official bodies, including the Commission for Racial Equality and the Home Secretary’s Advisory Council on Race Relations.  He is Director of the Network of Sikh Organisations (UK) and regularly represents the Sikh community at civic occasions such as the Commonwealth Service and the Remembrance Day Service at the Cenotaph in Whitehall, London.  King Charles III, Anglican bishops and the Metropolitan police have consulted him. He is prominent in the national and international interfaith movement, a patron of the World Congress of Faiths and an executive committee member of the Inter Faith Network UK. He was invited to the wedding of Prince William of Wales and Kate Middleton as a representative for the Sikh faith.

His participation in the Thought for the Day feature on BBC Radio 4's Today programme lasted from around 1984 to 2019. He left after editorial disagreements with the BBC.

Awards and honours
In 1989, he received the Templeton Award for services to spirituality. In 1991 he received the Inter faith Medallion for services to religious broadcasting. In 2004, he joined Benjamin Zephaniah and Peter Donohoe in being awarded an honorary doctorate (Doctor of Laws) from the University of Leicester. He came second to Bob Geldof in the BBC Radio 4's 2004 People's Lord poll An Officer of the Order of the British Empire (OBE) since June 1996, Singh was appointed Commander of the Order of the British Empire (CBE) in the 2009 New Year Honours.

On the recommendation of the House of Lords Appointments Commission, he was created a Crossbench (independent) life peer on 12 October 2011 taking the title Baron Singh of Wimbledon, of Wimbledon in the London Borough of Merton. He was introduced in the House of Lords on 24 October 2011, being the first member of the House of Lords to wear a turban. In the introduction ceremony, his Senior Supporter was The Baroness Kennedy of The Shaws and his Junior Supporter was The Lord Carey of Clifton. Singh received a coat of arms with a baronial coronet and, notably, the Khanda as his crest.

Personal life
Lord Singh is married to Kawaljit Singh OBE. They have two daughters and five grandchildren.

References

External links
 Profile at Faith and Media
 Profile at Parliament website
 Honorary doctorate
 "What God thinks of the world" (BBC News website)

1932 births
Living people
British male journalists
English Sikhs
Commanders of the Order of the British Empire
British broadcasters
People's peers
Crossbench life peers
People from Rawalpindi
British politicians of Indian descent
British Sikhs
Life peers created by Elizabeth II